The Nunggubuyu are an Aboriginal Australian people of eastern Arnhem Land in the Northern Territory.

Language
Nunggubuyu also called Wubuy is a non-Pama Nyungan language characterized by head marking with an intricate verb prefix morphology, bound pronominal forms for subject and object and prefixed noun classes. Together with Anindilyagwa it shares the distinction of being one of the most grammatically complicated Australian languages. It has at least 28 loanwords from Makassarese language. Its affiliation with other native Australian languages is disputed. Some speak of a Nunggubuyu–Ngandi language family, or of it belonging to a larger Gunwingguan language family.

The first dictionary of the language was written by the missionary Earl Hughes, who lived among the Nunggubuy for 17 years and spoke the language fluently. Intensive follow-up work, resulting in two major monographs, was undertaken by Jeffrey Heath in the 1970s.

Country
The Nunggubuyu's traditional lands extended over some  southwards from Cape Barrow and Harris Creek to the coastal area opposite Edward Island, and their western boundaries were formed by the Rose and Walker Rivers.

History
The Nunggubuyu had very important cultural and economic ties with the Warndarang, extinct now as a distinct language group though descendants of several clans of the latter were absorbed by the Nunggubuyu.

Social structure
As elsewhere in Australia, kinship and descent are dominant concerns of Nunggubuyu society. However they do not share the very frequent system of sections and subsections that determine affinal relations in many Australian tribes, but rather interpersonal genealogical relationships undergird the social structure. This feature, anomalous for the area, is one the Nunggubuyu share with Papuan and Melanasian peoples, such as the Marind-Anim people.

The society is structured by a four-fold division covering moieties, phratries, clans and patriarchal lineages.

There are two moieties: the Mandayung  (with myths that tend to associate it with continuity and dispute resolution) and the Mandaridja, whose myths suggest experimentation and change. They mirror in some respects the dua/yiridja moiety structures of the Yolngu of northeast Arnhem Land. For this reason Mandaridja people absorb into their totemic systems things that are of foreign provenance, such as ships, planes and tractors. There are two mytho-ritual complexes divided among these respective moieties. The Mandayung are the proprietors of the Gunabibi (Kunapipi) cult, while the Mandaridja control the "Ru:1" cult.

Notes

Citations

Sources

Aboriginal peoples of the Northern Territory